Josh Bayliss (born 18 September 1997) is a Scotland international rugby union player. He plays as a back row forward for Bath Rugby in Premiership Rugby.

Early life
Bayliss attended Millfield School in Somerset where he was head boy, and played cricket, hockey and represented the school in triple jump, as well as playing rugby.

Club career
He made his first team debut against Leicester Tigers  in the Anglo-Welsh Cup in November 2016 and made further appearances against Scarlets and Gloucester Rugby.

The following season saw Bayliss play in wins over the Newcastle Falcons and Ospreys during the pool stage of the Anglo-Welsh Cup and on 30 March 2018 he started in the final of the competition as Bath were defeated by Exeter Chiefs to finish runners up.

International career
Bayliss was a member of the England under-20 side that completed the grand slam during the 2017 Six Nations Under 20s Championship and later that year came off the bench as England lost to New Zealand in the final of the 2017 World Rugby Under 20 Championship to finish runners up.

Bayliss was called up to the Scotland squad for the 2021 Six Nations Championship, qualifying through his Aberdonian grandmother. Bayliss made his international debut on 7 November 2021 for Scotland against Australia in an Autumn International, when he came on as a substitute. He made his first international start against Japan on 20 November 2021.

References

External links
 

1997 births
Living people
Bath Rugby players
People educated at Millfield
People educated at Wellington School, Somerset
Rugby union flankers
Rugby union number eights
Scotland international rugby union players